Calderbank is a hamlet in the Canadian province of Saskatchewan located in Morse No. 165.

History
Calderbank had a post office from 1914 to 1969. The community was named after Calderbank, North Lanarkshire, Scotland, the original home of Richard Whitelaw, the first postmaster.

See also

 Scottish place names in Canada
 List of communities in Saskatchewan
 Hamlets of Saskatchewan

References

Morse No. 165, Saskatchewan